Fuel for the Fire is the first album by Ari Koivunen, the winner of the 2007 Finnish Idols competition.
Among the metal artists who have contributed material to the album are Timo Tolkki (ex Stratovarius, Revolution Renaissance), Marko Hietala (Nightwish, Tarot, Northern Kings), Janne Joutsenniemi (Suburban Tribe), Tony Kakko (Sonata Arctica, Northern Kings) and Jarkko Ahola (Teräsbetoni, Northern Kings).

Track listing

Personnel 
Ari Koivunen – vocals
Tuomas Wäinölä – lead guitar
Pasi Heikkilä – bass
Mirka Rantanen – drums
Janne Wirman – keyboards
Nino Laurenne - rhythm guitar

Ari Koivunen albums
2007 debut albums